Before 1958, Billboard magazine only charted Christmas singles and albums along with the other popular non-holiday records at the time.  This page examines the various specialty sections published during the holiday seasons that only survey Christmas music.

Deejay's Favorite Christmas Disks
An increase of Christmas records began charting Billboard's music surveys in 1957.  The Top 100 charted 9 Christmas singles, including the debut of the Bobby Helms' standard "Jingle Bell Rock" (Top 100 #6).  Gene Autry's newly recorded version of his 1949 original "Rudolph The Red-Nosed Reindeer" made the chart at #70.  The Best Selling Pop LP's had 11 seasonal albums chart including the debut of Elvis' Christmas Album that topped the survey for 3 weeks.

Bing Crosby's all-time best-selling single "White Christmas" returned to the Top 40 again in 1957 at #34.  It peaked at #7 on the chart's first year in 1955.   His holiday classic has charted Billboard's surveys almost annually since it first spent 11 consecutive weeks at No. 1 on their Best Selling Retail Records chart beginning Oct. 31, 1942 It reached the top spot again in 1945 for two more weeks and made it's 14th #1 week on December 28, 1946.   Crosby's previously charted "Silent Night" (Top 100 #54) and "Silver Bells" (Top 100 #78) also made the Top 100 in 1957. All 3 of these titles are included on his Merry Christmas which returned to #1 in January 1958 after charting Billboard's album surveys since its debut in 1945.

On November 24, 1958, the magazine published Deejay's Favorite Christmas Disks.  Described as the records played most frequently by disc jockeys each Christmas season, according to a survey made by The Billboard, the section consisted of 3 top 10 lists charting the top Holiday Singles, LP Albums and for the only time EP Albums.  Bing Crosby's "White Christmas" was the #1 single, Percy Faith's Music of Christmas was the #1 album and Pat Boone's Merry Christmas was the #1 EP Album.    A Holiday survey would not be published again until the annual Christmas Records section is launched in 1963.

Seven holiday singles charted on the first year of Billboard's Hot 100 in 1958 including the debut of "The Chipmunk Song (Christmas Don't Be Late)" (Hot 100 #1 for 4 weeks) and Harry Simeone's "Little Drummer Boy" (Hot 100 #13).  Bobby Helms' "Jingle Bell Rock" returned to the charts at #35.  Eight holiday albums charted on Billboard's Best-Selling LP's survey in 1958 including the debut of Johnny Mathis' Merry Christmas that peaked at #3 on December 27.  Mitch Miller & The Gang's first holiday album Christmas Sing Along with Mitch peaked at #1 on January 8, 1959.  Bing Crosby's "White Christmas" made its first Hot 100 appearance in 1959 at #59.  Perry Como debuted his second Christmas album Season's Greetings from Perry Como on The Billboard's TOP LP'S on January 8, 1960 peaking at #22.  

The 1960 Hot 100 had 10 holiday singles including the debut of an annual charting of Brenda Lee's standard "Rockin' Around The Christmas Tree" (Hot 100 #14) and the return of Nat King Cole's "The Christmas Song (Merry Christmas To You)" (Hot 100 #80).  Bing Crosby's "Silent Night" (Hot 100 #54) also returned in 1960 and he made his first charting of "Adeste Fidelis" (Hot 100 #45) which is also from his 1945 Merry Christmas album.  Bobby Helms returned to the HOT 100 at #36 in 1960 with the start of an annual charting of "Jingle Bell Rock".  Harry Simeone's "Little Drummer Boy" and "The Chipmunk Song" re-charted the Hot 100 every year after their initial release just as Christmas Sing Along with Mitch and Johnny Mathis' Merry Christmas album had on Billboard's Best-Selling LPs chart.  Bing Crosby's "White Christmas" returned to the Hot 100 in 1961 at #12 and in 1962 at #38.

Billboard's TOP LP's charted 21 holiday albums in 1962.  Mitch Miller's Gang peaked at #1 again with their latest Christmas album Holiday Sing Along with Mitch.  Bing Crosby returned with Merry Christmas (Mono LP's #46) and debuted his latest I Wish You a Merry Christmas (Mono LP's #50).  The 1962 HOT 100 had 12 seasonal singles including new releases like The 4 Seasons' "Santa Claus Is Coming To Town" (Hot 100 #23) and re-charting holiday standards like Nat King Cole's "The Christmas Song" (HOT 100 #65). Billboard debuted their first annual Christmas Records charts the following year.

Best Bets for Christmas
Beginning with the issue dated November 30, 1963, Billboard magazine no longer charted Christmas albums or singles on its existing music charts. For the next 10 years, these titles could only be found in their new Christmas Records section (retitled ''Billboard Best Best for Christmas in 1966). The 5-position survey ranking of top-selling Christmas (45) Singles and Christmas (LP) Albums ran for 3–5 weeks each holiday season expanding in size as sales activity increased

The Andy Williams Christmas Album was the first number one album and his version of "White Christmas" from the same album was the first number one single, both peaking at No. 1 for the 5 week entirety of the section run in 1963. The chart size increased each holiday season until peaking at 38 singles and 117 LPS in 1967.  In 1971, Billboard began running the surveys only 2–3 weeks a year and listing significantly less titles with the singles chart only having 3 positions on December 18 of that year.

Titles on these Christmas surveys did not appear on Billboard's other charts until 1973 when "Please Daddy" by John Denver and "If We Make It Through December" by Merle Haggard both appeared on the Best Selling Christmas Singles chart as well as the Hot 100 and Hot Country Singles charts. Many singles and albums have re-charted over the years, but hundreds of titles only appeared in these best-seller sections that are unavailable on Billboard's website.  The charts are extensively researched in Joel Whitburn's Christmas in the Charts 1920-2004 that contain statistics on every Christmas single and album that charted all of Billboard's music surveys.

Christmas music surveys were not published after the December 22, 1973 Best Bets For Christmas until the section continues in 1983 retitled as Christmas Hits.  From 1974 until 1976, Billboard sporadically provided a section entitled New Christmas Selections 
that alphabetically listed titles of holiday records.  Seasonal hit singles such as the Eagles' 1978 cover of "Please Come Home For Christmas" (Hot 100 #18) and Dan Fogelberg's 1980 "Same Old Lang Syne" (Hot 100 #9) as well as albums like John Denver's 1975 Rocky Mountain Christmas (Top LPs & Tapes #14) and Kenny Rogers' 1981 Christmas (Top LPs & Tapes #34) would only chart Billboards regular weekly surveys during that time.

Christmas Hits
Billboard began publishing the best-selling Christmas Album and Single chart survey section again under the title Christmas Hits on December 17, 1983.  Bing Crosby's "White Christmas" returned to the top of the Christmas singles chart that week.  Kenny Roger's 1981 Christmas was #1 on the album chart for the first two weeks of the survey.  The top 10 charts ran for two weeks each holiday season for 3 years.

Albums that charted Christmas Hits would also appear on other Billboard surveys, such as Kenny Rogers & Dolly Parton's 1984 Once Upon A Christmas (Top 200 Albums #31) and 1985's Alabama Christmas (Top 200 Albums #75). Elmo 'N Patsy's "Grandma Got Run Over By A Reindeer" was the only single that crossed over also charting the Hot Country Singles chart at #92 in 1983.  Band Aid's "Do They Know It's Christmas?" reached number 6 on Billboard's Hot Singles Sales chart in 1984 and had sold an estimated 2.5 million copies in the U.S. by January 1985, but did not appear on Billboard's Christmas Hits best selling singles chart.

Billboard published their last Christmas Hits single survey on December 28, 1985.  An alphabetical listing of Christmas singles would be featured in the magazine's "Reviews and Previews" section, but a seasonal weekly album chart would be the only Christmas survey published until the introduction of Holiday Songs in 2001.  Billboard would start surveying best selling Christmas songs in 2010 on the Holiday Digital Song Sales chart and then on the Holiday 100 
the following year.  Hit holiday singles like the HOT 100 Top 10 New Kids On The Block's 1989 "This One's For The Children" (HOT 100 #7) and Kenny G's 1999 cover of "Auld Lang Syne (The Millennium Mix)" (HOT 100 #7) were only surveyed on ''Billboards weekly single charts during the time.

Top Charting Christmas Singles
The Deejay's Favorite Christmas Disks, Christmas Records, Best Bets For Christmas and Christmas Hits single surveys ran 53 weeks and charted 134 titles from 1958 until 1985.  These are Billboard's top ranking Christmas 45 rpm records.

The following artists had at least 3 singles chart the Christmas single surveys.

Top Holiday Albums

After no holiday charts were published in 1986, the Christmas Hits section resumed December 12, 1987 with a 30-position album survey that ran for 2 weeks, but Billboard  stopped publishing the singles sale chart.  A Very Special Christmas topped the chart for the first 3 weeks of its return.  Billboard only published alternate weeks of the survey in the magazine, then started running the chart 2-3 inconsecutive weeks each holiday season in 1988.

The album-only Christmas Hits section was retitled simply Top Christmas Albums in 1990. Billboard begins running the chart 5 consecutive weeks each holiday season in 1991, but all  weeks are still not available in print.  After a 7-week run in 1992 and then 6 weeks in 1993, Billboard increased the survey size to 40 positions and ran the chart for 7–10 weeks beginning with the 1994 holiday season.Billboard renamed the survey Top Holiday Albums in 2000 then increased the chart size to 50 positions in 2002.  The survey run increased to 11 weeks in 2006.  Ever since 2007, Billboard begins publishing the Top Holiday Albums chart online in October for 14–15 weeks each holiday season until they reduced it to 12 weeks in 2022.

For over 60 years, Billboard has provided a Christmas holiday album survey, consecutively since the 1987 Christmas Hits charts.  The following albums have spent at least 6 weeks at the #1 position.<ref>Billboards online Top Holiday Album chart history only goes back to the December 21, 1985 Christmas Hits.  Also, only the data for the #1 position are listed for the weeks of 11/28/92, 12/5/92, 11/26/94 and 11/22/97.</ref>

The following albums have charted over 200 weeks on Billboard's Christmas Holiday Album surveys since November 24, 1958.

The following artists or series have had at least 6 albums chart Billboard's Christmas Holiday Album surveys since November 24, 1958.

Holiday SongsBillboard  introduced the 25-position Holiday Songs survey online December 8, 2001.  The chart differed from the previous best-selling Christmas singles survey by ranking songs based solely on radio airplay of Adult Contemporary and a few Adult Top 40 stations, most of which switch to all or nearly all Christmas music around Thanksgiving.  In the mid-1990's, holiday songs with no commercial single availability had begun appearing more often on Billboard's airplay charts.  New titles like "Christmas Eve (Sarajevo 12/24)" by the Trans-Siberian Orchestra (Hot Adult Contemporary #34) and "The Chanukah Song" by Adam Sandler (Hot Adult Contemporary #35) would re-chart annually each Christmas season along with older titles such as Paul McCartney's 1979 "Wonderful Christmastime" (Hot Adult Contemporary #29) and John & Yoko's 1971 "Happy Xmas (War Is Over)" (Hot Adult Contemporary #32).

The first number one Holiday Song was 1977's "Celebrate Me Home" by Kenny Loggins. The initial Holiday Songs chart had a 3-week run, then expanded to 6 weeks in 2002.  Starting 2006, Billboard increased the survey to 30 positions and ran the chart 6–9 weeks each holiday season.  The top 15 has occasionally appeared in the print magazine.  Since December 4, 2010, only Brenda Lee's 1958 "Rockin' Around The Christmas Tree", Burl Ives' 1964 "A Holly Jolly Christmas", Jose Feliciano's 1971 "Feliz Navidad" and Mariah Carey's 1994 "All I Want for Christmas Is You" have alternated the #1 position on the chart.

The Holiday Digital Song Sales survey of music download purchases debuted on October 16, 2010.  Billboard published the 50-position chart for at least 12 weeks each holiday season similar to the Top Holiday Albums chart, until they reduced it to a 7-week run at the beginning of December 2021 and then 6 weeks in 2022.  Holiday Digital Song Sales has charted significantly more songs and has the most weeks of all the Holiday Songs and Christmas Singles surveys at 154 weeks.  The top 15 occasionally appear in the print magazine.

On December 10, 2011, Billboard expanded the Holiday Song chart to 50 positions, reduced it back to a 5-6 week run and renamed it Holiday Airplay.  The newly reconfigured Hot Holiday Songs, like the Hot 100, ranks holiday tracks based on a formula blending airplay, download sales and streaming data as tracked by Nielsen Entertainment. The 50-position chart survey begins to appear in print and  Billboard.com in early December for 5–6 weeks each year.  On December 14, 2013, Holiday Songs was expanded to 100 positions and renamed the Holiday 100, although only the top 50 remain in print.

Topping the inaugural Hot Holiday Songs ranking was Mariah Carey's 1994 Hot 100 Airplay Christmas classic, "All I Want for Christmas Is You".  As of January 7, 2023, this song has been #1 for 57 of the chart's 62 total weeks, consecutively since December 12, 2015. It has also been #1 for 74 weeks on the Holiday Digital Song Sales chart and 49 weeks on the Holiday Airplay chart.  The only songs that have taken the #1 spot away from her on the Holiday 100 are Justin Bieber's "Mistletoe" in 2012, Ariana Grande's "Santa Tell Me" in 2015 and both Pentatonix's "Little Drummer Boy" in 2013 and "Mary, Did You Know?" in 2014. Brenda Lee's "Rockin' Around The Christmas Tree" has been holding at #2 for 38 weeks.Billboard also began publishing their 25-position Holiday Streaming Songs survey for 5–6 weeks each holiday season on December 14, 2013.  The chart size increased to 50 positions in 2016.  The survey measures the top streamed holiday radio songs, on-demand songs and videos from the leading U.S. online music services.  Mariah Carey's "All I Want For Christmas" has been #1 for 46 of the survey's 53 total weeks.  Besides Carey's hit, the only other songs that have topped the Holiday Streaming Songs charts are Pentatonix's "Mary, Did You Know?", Ariana Grande's "Santa Tell Me" and Brenda Lee's "Rockin' Around The Christmas Tree".  Carey's "All I Want For Christmas Is You" and other titles that top Billboard 's Holiday Song surveys every year have met criticism.https://variety.com/2019/music/news/mariah-carey-voted-most-annoying-christmas-song-uk-poll-1203420352/

In 2022, Billboard launched the Holiday 100 Songwriters and Producers charts that run during the same seasonal period as the Holiday 100.  The weekly songwriter and producer charts are based on total points accrued by a songwriter and producer, respectively, for each attributed song that appears on a specific chart. The Holiday 100 Songwriters and Producers charts join Billboard’s 26 other songwriter and producer rankings covering all “Hot”-named genre charts. These encompass the Hot 100 and the country, R&B/hip-hop, R&B, rap, rock & alternative, rock, alternative, hard rock, Latin, Christian, gospel and dance/electronic genres.  On the inaugural Holiday 100 Songwriters chart, Johnny Marks (who died in 1985 at age 75) was #1 thanks to seven songwriting credits on the Holiday 100. Lee Gillette (who died in 1981 at age 68) topped the inaugural Holiday 100 Producers survey, thanks to six production credits.

Holiday 100 Most Charted Songs

As of January 7, 2023, Billboards Holiday 100 has charted 299 songs.  The following ranked by peak position have consecutively charted every 62 weeks since its debut on December 10, 2011.

The following songs debuted on the Holiday 100 after December 20, 2011, and consecutively charted every week following for at least two holiday seasons.

The following artists have had at least 4 songs chart the Holiday 100.

Lists of Albums, Singles and Songs on ''Billboard'''s Christmas Holiday Charts
Best Bets for Christmas 1963–1973
Christmas Hits 1983–1989
Top Christmas Albums of the 1990s
Number one Holiday Songs 2001-2010
Number one Holiday Season Digital Song Sales 2010-2019
Number one Holiday Season Digital Song Sales of the 2020s
Number one Top Holiday Albums of the 2000s
Number one Top Holiday Albums of the 2010s
Number one Top Holiday Albums of the 2020s

See also
Billboard Charts
Billboard Greatest Christmas Hits CD Collection
Billboard Magazine
Christmas Music
List of best-selling Christmas albums in the United States
List of best-selling Christmas singles in the United States
List of Christmas hit singles in the United Kingdom
List of popular Christmas singles in the United States

References

External links
AllMusic: A comprehensive and in-depth resource for finding out more about the albums, bands, musicians and songs you love.
''Billboard'''s Greatest of All-Time Holiday 100 Songs
''Billboard'''s Greatest of All-Time Top Holiday Albums
''Billboard'''s most recent week of Holiday 100 Producers
''Billboard'''s most recent week of Holiday 100 Songwriters
''Billboard'''s most recent week of Holiday Airplay Songs
''Billboard'''s most recent week of Holiday Season Digital Song Sales
''Billboard'''s most recent week of Holiday Streaming Songs
''Billboard'''s most recent week of Hot Holiday 100 Songs
''Billboard'''s most recent week of Top Holiday Albums
Billboard’s Top 25 Holiday Albums, From Crosby & Cole to Bublé & Bocelli By Paul Grein
Discogs: A platform for music discovery and collection
Internet Archive: a non-profit library of millions of free books, movies, software, music, websites, and more.
MusicVF.com: US & UK hits charts
Records That Made ''Billboard'''s Christmas Singles Charts 1963-1985 (45cat.com)
The 100 Best Christmas Songs of All Time: Billboard Staff List
WorldRadioHistory.Com: A non-profit free online library

Christmas Holiday